Castello di Brianza is a comune (municipality) in the Province of Lecco in the Italian region Lombardy, located about  northeast of Milan and about  southwest of Lecco.

Castello di Brianza borders the following municipalities: Barzago, Colle Brianza, Dolzago, Rovagnate, Santa Maria Hoè, Sirtori.

References

External links
Official website

Cities and towns in Lombardy